Amigos is the seventh studio album by Santana released in 1976. It generated a minor U.S. hit single in "Let It Shine" and was the band's first album to hit the top ten on the Billboard charts since Caravanserai in 1972 (it ultimately reached gold record status). In Europe, the song "Europa" was released as a single and became a top ten hit in several countries.

New vocalist Greg Walker joined the group. It would be the last Santana album to include original bassist David Brown.

This album has been mixed and released in stereo and quadraphonic.

Track listing

Side one
 "Dance Sister Dance (Baila Mi Hermana)" (Leon Chancler, Tom Coster, David Rubinson) – 8:15
 "Take Me with You" (instrumental) (Leon Chancler, Tom Coster) – 5:27
 "Let Me" (Tom Coster, Carlos Santana) – 4:51

Side two
 "Gitano" (Armando Peraza) – 6:13
 "Tell Me Are You Tired" (Leon Chancler, Tom Coster) – 5:42
 "Europa (Earth's Cry Heaven's Smile)" (instrumental) (Tom Coster, Carlos Santana) – 5:06
 "Let It Shine" (David Brown, Ray Gardner) – 5:43

Personnel
 Greg Walker – vocals
 Carlos Santana – guitars, background vocals, percussion, congas, güiro
 Tom Coster – acoustic piano, Fender Rhodes electric piano, Hammond organ, Moog synthesizer, ARP Pro Soloist, ARP Odyssey, ARP String Ensemble, Hohner Clavinet D6, background vocals
 David Brown – bass guitar
 Leon "Ndugu" Chancler – drums, timbales, Remo Rototoms, percussion, congas, background vocals
 Armando Peraza – congas, bongos, background vocals, vocal on "Gitano"
 Ivory Stone – background vocals
 Julia Tillman Waters – background vocals
 Maxine Willard Waters – background vocals

Charts

Weekly charts

Year-end charts

Certifications and sales

References

Santana (band) albums
1976 albums
Columbia Records albums
Albums produced by Dave Rubinson
Albums recorded at Wally Heider Studios